Kim Se-In (born 29 July 1974) is a South Korean pole vaulter.
  
His personal best jump is 5.40 metres, achieved at the 2002 Asian Championships in Colombo.

Achievements

References

1974 births
Living people
South Korean male pole vaulters
Athletes (track and field) at the 2002 Asian Games
Athletes (track and field) at the 2006 Asian Games
Asian Games competitors for South Korea